OSIAN, or Open Source IPv6 Automation Network, is a free and open-source implementation of IPv6 networking for wireless sensor networks (WSNs). OSIAN extends TinyOS, which started as a collaboration between the University of California, Berkeley in co-operation with Intel Research and Crossbow Technology, and has since grown to be an international consortium, the TinyOS Alliance.  OSIAN brings direct Internet-connectivity to smartdust technology.

Design
Architecturally, OSIAN treats TinyOS as the underlying operating system providing hardware drivers, while OSIAN itself adds Internet networking capabilities.  Users are able to download and install OSIAN-enabled firmware to their embedded hardware, form a PPP connection with their computer, and communicate raw IPv6 UDP to other wireless sensors from their favorite programming language on their computer.

OSIAN is developed using a style very much like the development of Linux, which requires peer reviews and unit testing before any code moves into core repositories.

Platforms 
OSIAN is designed for deeply embedded systems with very small amounts of memory.  One primary platform contains a TI MSP430-based CC430 system-on-a-chip, which contains 32 kB ROM and 4 kB RAM.

See also 

 TinyOS
 Contiki
 6LoWPAN

External links
 SuRF Developer Kit supporting OSIAN

Wireless sensor network
Embedded systems